Tor Gustafsson Brookes (born either 1997 or 1998), better known by his online alias CatboyKami, is an Australian streamer known for his various online activities connected to far-right activism.

Early life 
Tor Brookes was born in Gothenburg, Sweden, and he was raised in Brisbane, Australia. In his youth, he played various video games with his father, under the online username "Kamikaze", Brookes finished high school around 2015, and started streaming in 2019.

Online activities 
Formerly going under the username "lolisocks", one of his most constant online activities is livestreaming himself in various activities, famously including online trolling of users on the popular chatting site Omegle.

Many of these clips are often shared through his personal Telegram channel. His most notorious stream was a 10-hour long meeting with American white nationalist Nick Fuentes, streamed in December 2019.

Starting in mid-2020, Brookes streamed uploaded multiple videos of himself to DLive and BitChute, where he wore racist outfits, including blackface and stereotypical outfits that mocked Blacks, Asians, and Jews, along with mocking the murder of George Floyd. His activities helped inspire ex-journalist Paul Miller, known online as GypsyCrusader, who participated in many of the same activities.  

Brookes, along with online streamer Anthime Gionet (known online as Baked Alaska), attended a rally in Phoenix, Arizona, where he chanted that "we will not fall for the lies of the Jews this time. This time, we know our war is with them", referring to the theory that Donald Trump won the 2020 American elections. Later at the rally, he clashed with a group of anti-Trump activists, where a Mexican activist alleged he yelled racist catchphrases and racial slurs. One of the attendees of said rally was Jake Angeli, popularly known as the "QAnon Shaman", who later attended the 2021 storming of the US Capitol. 

In February 2021, one of Brookes' streams was played at a Zoom meeting on racial equality organized by Pennsylvania State University, where he depicted himself dressed up as a police officer, kneeling on a doll of George Floyd. Later, Brookes was interviewed by the FBI, which he described as a "raid". 

Throughout his online activities, Brookes made a large attempt to hide his real identity. In July 2021, Brookes was outed by journalist Alex Mann, who revealed his real name on an ABC radio podcast episode. Before being identified, Brookes was often referred to as "Philip Hedley".

References 

1998 births
Living people
Australian white nationalists
Internet trolls
Swedish emigrants to Australia